High Expectations is the debut studio album by English singer and songwriter Mabel, released on 2 August 2019 by Polydor Records. Mabel worked with writers and producers such as Tre Jean-Marie, Steve Mac and MNEK to create the album, with its music incorporating genres of pop and R&B.

Upon its release, High Expectations received generally positive reviews from music critics, many of whom complimented its production and the singer's vocals. The album was also a success commercially, debuting at number three on the UK Albums Chart and at number five on the Irish Albums Chart.

To promote the album, Mabel announced the High Expectations Tour, consisting of 24 shows in Europe and commencing in January 2020. Mabel later released a reissue of the album on digital and streaming services to include "God Is a Dancer" with Tiesto, "Boyfriend", "West Ten" with AJ Tracey and "Tick Tock" with Clean Bandit.

Background
In October 2017, Mabel released her debut mixtape, Ivy to Roses. Its lead single, "Finders Keepers", peaked at number eight on the UK Singles Chart and became her first top ten single. The mixtape was then reissued in January 2019, with six singles released subsequent to the original release featuring, as well as its next single "Don't Call Me Up". Her debut album, High Expectations, was announced on 18 April of the same year, with a scheduled release date of 12 July. The release date was later moved to 2 August.

Singles
The album's lead single, "Don't Call Me Up", was released on 18 January 2019. It was initially included on the 2019 reissue of Ivy to Roses. The song peaked at number three on the UK Singles Chart for three consecutive weeks, making it Mabel's highest charting single in the UK. It became her international mainstream breakthrough, charting in the top 10 in over 20 other countries including Belgium, Ireland, the Netherlands and Norway where it reached the top three. The track also became the singer's first US Billboard Hot 100 chart entry where it rose to number 66.

"Mad Love" was released as the second single on 7 June 2019. It became Mabel's third UK top-10 single, peaking at number eight, and her second top-10 single in Ireland where it reached number six.

The album's first promotional single, "Bad Behaviour", was released on 23 July 2019 along with a music video directed by Oliver Kane. The track debuted at number 94 on the UK Singles Chart. A music video for "OK (Anxiety Anthem)" premiered on Dazed on 16 August 2019. It was directed by Jade Jackman.

Critical reception

High Expectations received generally positive reviews from music critics. At Metacritic, which assigns a normalised rating out of 100 to reviews from mainstream publications, the album received an average score of 61, based on 10 reviews. Reviewing the album for musicOMH, Ben Devlin hailed it as "a convincing display of versatility and quality songwriting that firmly establishes Mabel as a force to be reckoned with in UK pop", while Chris Taylor of DIY regarded it as "effortlessly cool" with "no faux-earnestness". Q magazine's Laura Barton called the album "highly polished" and said the singer "perfected the art of writing songs that even on first listen sound totally ubiquitous". In NME, Hannah Mylrea wrote that Mabel's "gorgeous silky vocals soar, the glossy production is stellar, but the exuberance and effervescent attitude that make tunes like 'Don't Call Me Up' so brilliant aren't found throughout."

Andrew Wright of The Skinny argued that the singer found her individual identity with High Expectations which he described as well-rounded despite "some over-zealous Top 40 attempts". Conversely, Joe Hale of Clash found it "almost too airbrushed, with Mabel playing it a little too safe to qualify being described as wholly original or progressive", but concluded that it had "some real highlights" and "moments of talent and flair". Despite finding the album strong and well-crafted, The Guardians Alexis Petridis also believed it lacked personality and only "occasionally hints its maker might be more interesting and individual". Kitty Empire was more critical in The Observer, writing, "High Expectations is just disappointingly all right, lacking any playfulness, or top spin, or a sense of who Mabel is," while Uncut critic Johnny Sharp commented, "Despite some pleasant enough tunes, she lacks the vocal charisma to stand out from other wannabe Rihannas, Mileys and Dua Lipas." Mick Jacobs of PopMatters concluded, "Though sung in a beautiful, agile voice, the album's contents lack any innovation that truly set them apart, even amongst themselves."

Commercial performance
High Expectations debuted at number three on the UK Albums Chart, behind Ed Sheeran's No.6 Collaborations Project and Lewis Capaldi's Divinely Uninspired to a Hellish Extent, with first-week sales of 9,761 album-equivalent units. It dropped to number 10 in its second week with sales of 4,184 units. On the Irish Albums Chart, it bowed at number five, the highest new entry for the chart dated 9 August 2019. The album also debuted in the top 40 in Norway and Switzerland. In the US, High Expectations entered at number 198 on the Billboard 200. Hugh McIntyre of Forbes cited its debut as "a prime example of how the UK and the US music industries can be drastically different".

Tour 
Mabel announced her headlining tour of the UK and Europe on July 19, 2019 via her social media. The general sale of tickets started on July 21, and the pre-sale of the album on July 24, 2019. The support was Kali Claire - UK R&B singer and songwriter. The tour started on January 28, 2020 in Dublin, Ireland.

Track listing
Credits adapted from the album liner notes.

Notes
  signifies an additional producer
  signifies a vocal producer
  signifies a co-producer

Personnel
Credits for High Expectations adapted from Allmusic.

Performers and vocals

 Mabel – primary artist, vocals 
 Kamille – background vocals , additional vocals , featured vocals 
 Kojo Funds – vocals 
 Not3s – vocals 
 Rich the Kid – vocals 
 RAYE – vocals 
 Stefflon Don – vocals 
 Anthony Hannides – background vocals 
 Michael Hannides – background vocals, piano, drums 
 169 – background vocals, drum programming, keyboards 
 MNEK – background vocals, keyboards, drum programming , additional vocals 
 Kali Claire McLoughlin – background vocals 
 Nick Trygstad – cello 
 Simon Turner – cello 
 Paulette Bayley – violin 
 Peter Whitfield – violin 
 Sarah Brandwood-Spencer – violin 
 Tre Jean-Marie – bass, piano, strings, synthesizer 
 Josh Werner – bass guitar 
 Chris Laws – drums 
 Steve Mac – keyboards 
 Tim Laws – guitar 
 Al Shux – bass, drums, keys 
 Fraser T. Smith – drum programming , keyboards 
 Jordan Riley – drums, keyboards , synthesizer programming , bass, piano 
 Lewis Allen – guitar  
 Leo Kalyan – (drums and keys) programming 
 Stephen Kozmeniuk – drums, strings 
 Jimmy Napes – piano 
 Marlon Roudette – electric guitar 
 Alastair "AoD" O'Donnell – guitar 
 Timucin Lam – all instruments 
 Twice as Nice – drum, synthesizer programming 
 Charlie Handsome – synthesizer programming, drums 
 Josh Crocker – drums, keyboards

Production

 Tre Jean-Marie – production 
 Dre Skull – production 
 WILDLIFE! – additional production 
 Cameron Gower Poole – (additional) vocal production  
 Steve Mac – production  
 Oak – production 
 Al Shux – production 
 Fraser T. Smith – production 
 Jordan Riley – production 
 MakeYouKnowLove – production 
 Tyrell Paul – production 
 Snakehips – production 
 MXXWLL – production 
 MNEK – production 
 KOZ – production 
 Leo Kalyan – additional production 
 JD. Reid – production 
 Alastair "AoD" O'Donnell – additional production 
 Jay Weathers – production 
 Jax Jones - production 
 Mark Ralph - co-production 
 Twice as Nice – production 
 Charlie Handsome – production 
 Josh Crocker – production 
 GA – production 
 Joel Pott – production

Technical

 Tre Jean-Marie – programming 
 Nosa Apollo – programming 
 Geoff Swan – mixing 
 Lewis Chapman – assistant mixing 
 Bill Zimmerman – additional engineering 
 Phil Tan – mixing 
 Dan Pursey – engineering 
 Chris Laws – engineering 
 Mark "Spike" Stent – mixing 
 Al Shux – recording 
 Manny Marroquin – mixing 
 Chris Galland - engineering 
 Jordan Riley – recording 
 Niko Battistini – mix assistant 
 Michael Freeman – mix assistant 
 Wez Clarke – additional programming , mixing 
 Cameron Gower Poole – mixing , recording 
 MNEK – background vocals recording 
 Matt Snell – assistant engineering 
 JD. Reid – engineering , programming 
 Jay Weathers – engineering 
 Mike Spencer – additional engineering, mixing 
 Mark Ralph – mixing 
 Jamie Snell – editing 
 Dan Parry – mixing 
 Josh Crocker – programming

Artwork

 Mariano Vivanco – photography
 Ted Lovett (Studio) – art direction and design

Charts

Weekly charts

Year-end charts

Certifications

Release history

High Expectations... Stripped
High Expectations... Stripped is an acoustic version of the album recorded by Mabel at her home studio during the COVID-19 lockdowns. The album was released on 31 July 2020.

Mabel announced the album on 28 July 2020, saying "This year turned everyone's plans sideways and I’ve been using the time in my home studio to record an acoustic version of every track. Something a bit more intimate from me".

Track listing

References

2019 debut albums
Polydor Records albums
Capitol Records albums
Albums produced by Steve Mac
Albums produced by MNEK
Albums produced by Oak Felder
Albums produced by Fraser T. Smith
Albums produced by Al Shux
Albums produced by Tre Jean-Marie
Albums produced by Jordan Riley
Mabel (singer) albums